Radical 208 meaning "rat" or "mouse" is 1 of 4 Kangxi radicals (214 radicals total) composed of 13 strokes.

In the Kangxi Dictionary there are 92 characters (out of 49,030) to be found under this radical.

Characters with Radical 208

Literature

External links
Unihan Database - U+9F20

208